The Night With... is a classical music production company based in Glasgow, touring concerts across Scotland and the United Kingdom.

History
Started in 2016 by Matthew Whiteside, The Night With... presents music, primarily contemporary classical, in informal venues. The concerts are presented in three 15 to 30 minute thirds, rather than the traditional concert halves, to create a more informal and relaxed atmosphere for audience members. Since it began it has provided development and commissioning opportunities for young and emerging composers and performers. Since 2017 it has run a Call for Scores for emerging composers.

The aim of The Night With... is to create a touring network across the UK with the same programmes repeated multiple times. The 2019 season featured the same programmes in Glasgow, Edinburgh, Aberdeen and Belfast and was part of the Made in Scotland Showcase at the Edinburgh Fringe.

The concert series has slowly gained a following and generated positive reviews in the press.

In 2019, 'The Night With... began releasing live recordings from the season on its label, TNW Music. This culminated in the release of The Night With... Live Vol. One.

Awards
 2019 – Shortlisted for the Award for Creative Programming at the Scottish Awards for New Music
 2020 – Shortlisted for the RCS Award for Making it Happen at the Scottish Awards for New Music
2020 – Winner of the SMIA Award for Creative Programming at the Scottish Awards for New Music

Performers

2016
Red Note Ensemble
 Electric Clarinet
 Carla Rees

2017
Red Note Ensemble
 Tom Poulson, Danielle Price and Timothy Cooper
 Joanna Nicholson and Emma Lloyd
 The Aurea Quartet

2018
Wooden Elephant
 James Turnbull
Juice Vocal Ensemble
 Turning the Elements

2019
Duo van Vliet
 Turning the Elements
 Tom Poulson, Danielle Price and Timothy Cooper
Ensemble Offspring
Garth Knox
Ensemble 1604
The Hermes Experiment

Venues
 The Hug and Pint, Glasgow
 Fruitmarket Gallery, Edinburgh
 Scottish Storytelling Centre, Edinburgh
 Stills Gallery, Edinburgh
 BrewDog Castlegate, Aberdeen
 Belmont Filmhouse, Aberdeen
 Black Box, Belfast

World premières
The following works received their world première at The Night With...

References

External links
 The Night With... website

2016 establishments in Scotland
Organizations established in 2016
Companies based in Glasgow
Classical music festivals in Scotland
Chamber music festivals